Oscar Armando Cupo (Buenos Aires, 26 December 1921 - 21 July 1990) was a piano player, composer and bandleader in Argentina during the golden age of tango.

In 1952 Cupo's orchestra invited a singer Roberto Rufino. He also worked with Alberto Morán in 1955. In 1960 Cupo created an orchestra "Estrellas de Buenos Aires". In 1972 he was one of the founders of Sexteto Mayor orchestra.

Armando Cupo is a composer of tangos “Con este corazón”, “Siempre a tiempo” and “Una vida más”.

References

1921 births
1990 deaths
Argentine conductors (music)
Male conductors (music)
Argentine pianists
Male pianists
Argentine tango musicians
Orquesta Osvaldo Pugliese